Furqan (Arabic: فُرقَان furqān), also spelt Furqaan, is an Arabic Islamic masculine given name, which means "criterion, proof, evidence, affirmation, testament". The Turkish spelling of the name is Furkan.

Furqan is another name of the Holy Qur'an and the 25th surah Al-Furqān.

Furqan or Furqaan means the Separator of Right from Wrong. It is about the lives of the former peoples, such as; the people of Rass, and the people’s regret in the Hereafter, the signs of Unity, the greatness of Allah in nature, and the comparison of believers with unbelievers; but the most important part of the Ayah is this holy Surah is about the qualities of /‘ibad-ur-rahman/ (the servants of Allah) who are the true servants of Allah, which begin from Ayah 63 up to the end of the Surah 77.

It may refer to:

 The Quran
al-Furqan, the 25th sura of the Qur'an
 Al-Furqan Islamic Heritage Foundation
 al-Furqan Media Foundation

See also
Al-Farooq (disambiguation)